Carlos Etchegoyen Herrera (1903 – death date unknown) was a Cuban infielder in the Negro league in the 1930s.

A native of Marianao, Cuba, Etchegoyen made his Negro leagues debut in 1930 with the Cuban Stars (East). He played several seasons with the Stars and the Pollock's Cuban Stars through 1937.

References

External links
 and Baseball-Reference Black Baseball stats and Seamheads

1903 births
Date of birth missing
Year of death missing
Place of death missing
Cuban Stars (East) players
Pollock's Cuban Stars players
Baseball infielders
Baseball players from Havana